The 2006–07 season was the 59th season of competitive football in Israel, and the 80th season under the Israeli Football Association, established in 1928, during the British Mandate.

IFA Competitions

League Competitions

Cup Competitions

International Club Competitions

Champions League

Third qualifying round

|}

Uefa Cup

Second qualifying round

|}

First round

|}

Group stage

Group A

Group G

Round of 32

|}

Last 16

|}

Intertoto Cup

Second round

|}

Third round

|}

National Teams

National team

Euro 2008 Qualifying (Group E)

Friendlies

Women's National Team

2009 UEFA Women's Championship Qualifying

Preliminary round – Group 2
Played in Bosnia and Herzegovina:

Qualifying Stage – Group 6

U-21 National team

2007 European U-21 Championship

Qualifying Groups

Play-offs

2007 European U-21 Championship (Group A)

U-19 National team

2007 European U-19 Championship

2007 European U-19 qualifying round (Group 2)

2007 European U-19 elite round (Group 6)

U-17 National team

U-19 Women's National team

Notes